Paranerita flexuosa is a moth of the subfamily Arctiinae. It was described by William Schaus in 1911. It is found in Costa Rica.

References

Paranerita
Moths described in 1911